Conor O'Grady (born 27 May 1980) is a former Irish footballer who last played for Ballinamallard United.

For his home town club he was sent off in a 2009–10 UEFA Europa League tie against Albanian side Vllaznia.

O'Grady represented his country at the UEFA U-19 Championship in Sweden in 1999 where he won a bronze medal.

In August 2012 he moved to IFA Premiership newcomers Ballinamallard United.

Honours
Sligo Rovers
League of Ireland First Division (1): 2005
FAI Cup (1): 2010
League of Ireland Cup (2): 2010League of Ireland Cup 1998.

Cork City
Munster Senior Cup 2, 2002,2003.

International.
Celtic Cup winner Irish Schools 1999.
European Championships U-18 Bronze Sweden 1999.

Individual.
Cork City Player Of The Year 2001/02.
Sligo Rovers Player Of The Year 2005.
Irish Schools Player Of The Year 1999.

References

Living people
League of Ireland players
Sligo Rovers F.C. players
Cork City F.C. players
Derry City F.C. players
Finn Harps F.C. players
Republic of Ireland under-21 international footballers
1980 births
Association football midfielders
NIFL Premiership players
Republic of Ireland association footballers
Ballinamallard United F.C. players